He Laughs Last is a 1920 American silent comedy film featuring Oliver Hardy.

Cast
 Jimmy Aubrey as The New Sheriff
 Dixie Lamont as The Dove of Peace Center
 Oliver Hardy as Handsome Hal (as Babe Hardy)

See also
 List of American films of 1920
 Oliver Hardy filmography

External links

1920 films
1920 comedy films
1920 short films
American silent short films
American black-and-white films
Films directed by Jess Robbins
Silent American comedy films
American comedy short films
1920s American films
1920s English-language films